Ringim  is a Local Government Area (LGA) of Jigawa State, Nigeria. Its headquarters are in the town of Ringim, the LGA has an area of 1,057 km² and a population of 192,024 at the 2006 census.

History
Ringim emirate came into being in November, 1991 as a result of the creation of Jigawa state from Kano state on 27 August 1991 by the then president and commander in-chief of the Nigerian Armed Forces, General Ibrahim Badamasi Babangida. The emirate consist of four Local Government Areas, viz: Ringim, Taura, Garki and Babura. The current Emir of Ringim, Alh. (Dr). Sayyadi Abubakar Mahmoud Usman (CON) is the first Fulani Emir of Ringim. The Emir was the chairman co-operative of West Africa.

Economy
Historically, Ringim Local Government is popular all over the country for its economic development. The area has a fertile land for both wet and dry seasons farming activities. The Local Government produces both subsistence and cash crops and also has great number fruits trees scattered along the bank of the river. In addition to the farming activities majority of the populace, engaged in marketing. These economic resources enable most of the parents to possess means of paying their children’s school fees. The town was famous for its rich in groundnuts, tobacco production and trade, this motivated the British to construct railway from Kano to Nguru via the town.

Education
year 1930 was the beginning of various educational developments in Ringim. In 1930, the first elementary school was established in Ringim (Katutu Primary School). Pupils recruited for 1931 was 39. In 1954, another elementary school (Sabon Gida Senior Primary School) was established. As a result of UPE programme in 1976 more schools were constructed in Ringim town and the pupils enrolments increased, Galadanchi primary school and conversion of St. Peters into Sabon Gari primary school. This brought the number of primary schools in Ringim into four in addition to a number of Islamiyya Schools. In 9176, Government Secondary School was formally moved to Ringim after it stayed temporarily for two years at dawakin Tofa and a higher institution under Jigawa Polytechnic was established in 1991.

Politics
Ringim had played great role for the survival of Kano during various attacks of Gumel and Damagaran to Kano emirate.

The Hussaini Adamu Federal Polytechnic has its College of Islamic and Legal Studies at Ringim.

The postal code of the area is 733.

References

Local Government Areas in Jigawa State